Coffin Baby (aka Coffin Baby - The Toolbox Killer Is Back) is a 2013 American slasher film written and directed by Dean C. Jones and starring Bruce Dern, Brian Krause, Clifton Powell, and Ethan Phillips. It has been represented as a sequel to 2004's Toolbox Murders, but is not. The majority of the footage in the film was shot for Toolbox Murders 2, the sequel to the 2004 film in which the eponymous toolbox killer, Coffin Baby, resumes his gruesome killing spree from the first film. Actor Christopher Doyle reprises his 2004 role as Coffin Baby.  However, distribution of Coffin Baby has been stopped by agreement between Dean Jones and the producers of Toolbox Murders 2.

Plot

In Hollywood, Samantha Forester (Chauntal Lewis) is kidnapped by "Coffin Baby" (Christopher Doyle), branded, locked in a cage, and forced to witness dozens upon dozens of other Los Angeles citizens being murdered in various brutal ways. When she is reported as missing,  But, later, by unknown reason he cut off her left hand. After 10 days in captivity, Coffin Baby falls in love with Samantha and gives her an orchid. Becoming crazed by her confinement, she herself eats cooked human flesh from another blonde victim.

Cast
 Bruce Dern as Vance Henrickson
 Brian Krause as Detective Chad Cole
 Clifton Powell as Detective S. Jackson
 Chauntal Lewis as Samantha Forester
 Christopher Doyle as Coffin Baby
 Ethan Phillips as Coroner B. Jones
 Ron Chaney as Detective L. Wehage
 Isabelle Freitheim as Sabrina Forester
 Allison Kyler as Amy Weinstein
 Whitney Anderson as Winter Jones
 Dean C. Jones as H. Bogart
 Mychal Thompson as Rodney W. Smith
 Douglas Tait as CB double

Production
In October 2012, filmmakers and brothers Dean Jones and Starr Jones shot Coffin Baby  in Alamance County, North Carolina, on locations in their hometown  of Graham, North Carolina. Area emergency workers and residents served as extras.

Release

Reception

Nav Qateel of Influx Magazine wrote that the film had the potential to be decent but failed.

References

External links
 
 
 

2010s slasher films
2013 films
2013 horror films
American sequel films
American serial killer films
American slasher films
American horror films
American independent films
Direct-to-video sequel films
Films about cannibalism
Films shot in North Carolina
2010s English-language films
2010s American films